Geldoff is a character appearing in American comic books published by Marvel Comics. He first appeared in the Ultimate Marvel Universe's Ultimate Spider-Man #40 (July 2003) written by Brian Michael Bendis with art from Mark Bagley. Geldoff was brought to Earth-616 by Dan Slott and Christos N. Gage in Avengers: The Initiative #8 (February 2008), where he was given the code name, Proton.

Fictional character biography

Geldoff was a Latverian orphan who was experimented on in the womb. While drunk at a party, Geldoff blew up random cars with his powers. Aware of Geldoff's rampages, Spider-Man denounced his irresponsible behavior. When police arrived, Spider-Man was made to leave and Geldoff clung to the back of his costume as Spider-Man swung away.

Spider-Man again tried to make Geldoff realize how irresponsible he had been. Spider-Man tried to convince him to use his abilities to help people, but Geldoff could not see why. When Spider-Man paused to foil a robbery in a shop below, Geldoff blew up a vehicle outside the shop, injuring those inside indiscriminately. Geldoff believed he had performed a good deed, and was shocked when an enraged Spider-Man attacked him. Geldoff angrily threatened to use his powers directly on the hero, but was interrupted by the arrival of the X-Men. Confronted by the mutants, Geldoff fainted.

Geldoff was taken back to their mansion for examination. Awaking in a panic en route, Geldoff blew out the side of the plane. Later, at the mansion, Professor Xavier telepathically sedated Geldoff and determined his experimental origins. Horrified, Xavier decided to present Geldoff to scientific organizations and the United Nations as proof of immoral and illegal genetic research. Spider-Man headed home, but not before the woozy Geldoff apologized for threatening him.

Powers and abilities
Geldoff can generate and discharge explosive energy balls. How this power effects living tissue is unknown, as he has yet to use it on anything organic. Geldoff himself seems immune to the energy.

Other versions

Earth-616

Geldoff was introduced into Earth-616 (core Marvel Universe) by writers Dan Slott and Christos N. Gage along with artist Stefano Caselli, as a Fifty State Initiative recruit in Avengers: The Initiative #8 (February 2008) who arrives in the Camp Hammond training facility during the issue. Geldoff is seen in the following issue using the codename Proton during a combat training exercise when MVP clone KIA attacks. In the aftermath of the "Killed In Action" storyline, Proton is one of the recruits who presents a deceased Dragon Lord's ashes to his family.

Making his first appearance outside Avengers The Initiative, Proton is shown fighting a Skrull invasion of New York City in Secret Invasion #3. He is one of the characters who are shown to be killed during this issue, a scene later repeated in Avengers: the Initiative #16. Secret Invasion lead writer Brian Michael Bendis commented on the death of Proton by saying that he had asked Dan Slott which character he could kill off, and stated that Slott had built characters for this exact purpose.

Inhuman
Another alternate version of Geldoff named Geldhoff (also created by Brian Michael Bendis) later appears during Inhumanity. He is introduced as a Latverian teenager visiting the U.S. as part of a student exchange programs, and begins to manifest his dormant Inhuman heritage after being exposed to the Terrigen Mist. After a brief scuffle with the X-Men, he is kidnapped by Monica Rappaccini.

See also
Ultimate Spider-Man (story arcs)
Ultimate Spider-Man

References

External links

Ultimate Geldoff at Marvel Directory
Geldoff (Ultimate) at Marvel.com Universe

Characters created by Brian Michael Bendis
Characters created by Christos Gage
Characters created by Dan Slott
Characters created by Mark Bagley
Comics characters introduced in 2003
Comics characters introduced in 2008
Superheroes who are adopted
Fictional immigrants to the United States
Marvel Comics mutates
Marvel Comics superheroes
Ultimate Marvel characters